Shrewsbury is the county town of Shropshire in the United Kingdom, founded c. 800. A number of people, places and other locations have their names deriving from this original place.

People
Earl of Shrewsbury, in the peerage of England
Arthur Shrewsbury (1856–1903), English cricketer
Arthur Shrewsbury (cricketer, born 1874), English cricketer
Henry L. Shrewsbury (born ), American politician
Ralph of Shrewsbury (died 1363), English bishop
Richard of Shrewsbury, Duke of York (1473–), son of King Edward IV
Robert of Shrewsbury (died 1212), English cleric and judge
Robert of Shrewsbury (died 1168), abbot of Shrewsbury Abbey
Tom Shrewsbury (born 1995), English cricketer
William Shrewsbury (1795-1866), British Methodist minister
William Shrewsbury (cricketer) (1854–1931), English cricketer

Places

Australia
Shrewsbury Rock, Queensland

Canada
Shrewsbury, Ontario
Shrewsbury, Quebec

Ireland
Shrewsbury Road, Ballsbridge, Dublin

Jamaica
Shrewsbury, Portland, a town in Portland Parish

United States
Shrewsbury, Kentucky
Shrewsbury, Louisiana
Shrewsbury, Massachusetts
Shrewsbury, Missouri
Shrewsbury, New Jersey
Shrewsbury Township, New Jersey
Shrewsbury, Upper Freehold, New Jersey
Shrewsbury Township, Lycoming County, Pennsylvania
Shrewsbury Township, Sullivan County, Pennsylvania
Shrewsbury Township, York County, Pennsylvania
Shrewsbury, Pennsylvania, a Borough
Shrewsbury, Vermont
Shrewsbury, West Virginia
Shrewsbury River, a tributary of the Navesink River in New Jersey

Ships
HMS Shrewsbury, the name of various ships of the British Royal Navy
USS Shrewsbury (SP-70), a United States Navy patrol boat in commission from 1917 to 1919

Associated with Shrewsbury, England
Battle of Shrewsbury
Royal Shrewsbury Hospital
Shrewsbury Abbey
Shrewsbury railway station
Shrewsbury Abbey railway station
Shrewsbury School
Shrewsbury Town F.C.
Shrewsbury and Atcham
Shrewsbury and Atcham (UK Parliament constituency)
Shrewsbury Town Football Club
Shrewsbury, an 1897 novel by Stanley J. Weyman

Other uses
Shrewsbury cake
 Shrewsbury House, Vicars' Close, Wells, Somerset England